Millis may refer to:

 Millis (surname)
 Millis, Massachusetts, a town in Norfolk County, Massachusetts, United States
 Millis (MBTA station), a former train station in that town
 Millis Branch, a rail line formerly ending at that station
 Millis High School
 Millis, Syria, a village in Syria

See also
Millis-Clicquot, Massachusetts, a census-designated place in Millis, Massachusetts
Milles
Milli (disambiguation)